Lilydale, Lily Dale, Lillydale or Lillydale may refer to:

Australia
Lilydale, Tasmania, a small town in Northern Tasmania
Lilydale, Victoria, a suburb of Melbourne, Australia
Lilydale railway line, a suburban electric railway in Melbourne, Australia
Lilydale railway station, a railway station in Melbourne, Australia
Lillydale Lake, a lake in Australia

Canada
Lilydale, Nova Scotia

South Africa
Lillydale, Mpumalanga, a town in South Africa

United States
Lilydale, Chicago
Lilly Dale, Indiana, an unincorporated community
Lilydale, Minnesota, a town south of St. Paul
Lily Dale, New York, a spiritualist community in western New York
Lillydale, Monroe County, West Virginia, an unincorporated community
Lillydale, Wyoming County, West Virginia, an unincorporated community